Abelard refers to Pierre Abelard (1079–1142), a 12th-century French scholastic philosopher and logician.

Abelard may also refer to:

 Gesner Abelard, Haitian painter
 Abelard Snazz, fictional character in the comic 2000AD
 The Abelard School, Toronto-based private school, named after Peter Abélard
 Abelard of Hauteville, Italian noble
 HMS Abelard, cancelled Amphion class submarine
 Abelard-Schuman, a defunct American publisher acquired by Thomas Y. Crowell Co.

See also
Abelardo